Ryan Hinchcliffe (born 7 October 1984) is an Australian former professional rugby league footballer who last played for the Huddersfield Giants in the Super League, as a  and , and previously played for the Melbourne Storm in the National Rugby League.

Early life
Hinchcliffe was born in Temora, New South Wales, Australia. He was educated at Temora High School and played junior rugby league for Temora Dragons.

Playing career
Hinchliffe, a Temora Dragons junior, began his NRL career at Parramatta, although he previously played for the Canberra Raiders before moving to Melbourne, with whom he won the 2009 NRL Premiership.  This premiership was later stripped in 2010 due to the club's multiple and deliberate breaches of the salary cap between 2006 and 2010.

He joined the Melbourne Storm from the Canberra Raiders for the 2009 NRL season. In Melbourne his impressive form resulted in reshuffles with Cameron Smith moving to five-eighth when lacking halves.

Hinchcliffe won the Storm's Player of the Year Award in 2010.

In 2012, he played in their premiership victory over Canterbury-Bankstown. Five months later, he played in their 2013 World Club Challenge win over Leeds.

In 2011 Hinchcliffe made his representative début for NSW Country and was again selected for the side in 2012.

On 22 June 2015, Hinchcliffe signed a 3-year contract with Super League team Huddersfield Giants starting in 2016.

On 4 September 2018, Hinchcliffe announced that he would be retiring at the end of the season.

Coaching career

Hinchcliffe returned to Melbourne following his retirement as a player, taking up a role as a development coach at Melbourne Storm. He was a member of the coaching staff when Storm won the 2020 NRL Grand Final.

References

External links
Huddersfield Giants profile
SL profile

1984 births
Living people
Australian rugby league players
Australian expatriate sportspeople in England
Country New South Wales Origin rugby league team players
Canberra Raiders players
Melbourne Storm players
Rugby league locks
Rugby league hookers
Rugby league players from New South Wales
Huddersfield Giants players